James Ferris or Ferriss may refer to:

 James Ferris (1932–2016), American chemist
 James Marshall Ferris (1828–1893), Canadian politician
 James Ferriss (1849–1926), American politician and amateur conchologist